Mephitidae is a family of mammals comprising the skunks and stink badgers. They are noted for the great development of their anal scent glands, which they use to deter predators. Skunks were formerly classified as a subfamily of the Mustelidae (the weasel family); however, recent genetic evidence has caused skunks to be treated as a separate family. Similarly, the stink badgers had been classified with badgers, but genetic evidence shows they share a more recent common ancestor with skunks, so they are now included in the skunk family. A 2017 study using retroposon markers indicated that they are most closely related to the Ailuridae (red pandas and allies) and Procyonidae (raccoons and allies).

There are twelve extant species of mephitids in four genera: Conepatus (hog-nosed skunks, four species); Mephitis (the hooded and striped skunks, two species); Mydaus (stink badgers, two species); and Spilogale (spotted skunks, four species). The two stink badgers in the genus Mydaus inhabit Indonesia, Brunei, Malaysia and the Philippines; the other members of the family inhabit the Americas, ranging from Canada to central South America. All other mephitids are extinct, known through fossils, including those from Eurasia. 

In taxonomic order, the living species of Mephitidae are:

Genera

References

 
Mammal families
Taxa named by Charles Lucien Bonaparte